Wilmot Reed Hastings Jr. (born October 8, 1960) is an American billionaire businessman. He is the co-founder, and executive chairman of Netflix and currently sits on a number of boards and non-profit organizations. A former member of the California State Board of Education, Hastings is an advocate for education reform through charter schools.

Early life
Hastings was born in Boston, Massachusetts. His father Wilmot Reed Hastings Sr. was an attorney for the Department of Health, Education and Welfare in the Nixon administration, and his mother Joan Amory Loomis was a Boston debutante from a Social Register family who was repulsed by the world of high society and taught her children to disdain it. His maternal great-grandfather was Alfred Lee Loomis.

Hastings attended Buckingham Browne & Nichols School in Cambridge, Massachusetts, and sold vacuum cleaners door-to-door in a gap year before entering college. In 1983, he graduated from Bowdoin College with a Bachelor of Arts degree in Mathematics, which he found "beautiful and engaging".

He joined the Marine Corps officer training through their Platoon Leader Class, and spent college summers in the Marines, including a stint at the Officer Candidate School boot camp at Marine Corps Base Quantico, Virginia in the summer of 1981. He did not complete the training and never commissioned into the Marine Corps—choosing instead to pursue service in the Peace Corps “out of a combination of service and adventure”. He went to teach math at a high school of around 800 students in rural northwest Swaziland from 1983 to 1985 after college. He credits part of his entrepreneurial spirit to his time in the Peace Corps, remarking that, “Once you have hitchhiked across Africa with ten bucks in your pocket, starting a business doesn't seem too intimidating”.

After returning from the Peace Corps, Hastings went on to attend Stanford University after being rejected from his first choice MIT, graduating in 1988 with a Master's Degree in Computer Science.

Career

Founding of Pure Software 
Hastings' first job was at Adaptive Technology, where he created a tool for debugging software. He met Audrey MacLean in 1990 when she was CEO at Adaptive Corp. In 2007, Hastings told CNN, "From her, I learned the value of focus. I learned it is better to do one product well than two products in a mediocre way."

Hastings left Adaptive Technology in 1991 to lay the foundation to his first company, Pure Software, which produced products to troubleshoot software. The company's growth proved challenging for Hastings, as he lacked managerial experience. He stated he had trouble managing with a rapid headcount growth. His engineering background didn't prepare him for the challenges of being a CEO, and he asked his board to replace him, stating he was losing confidence. The board refused, and Hastings says he learned to be a businessman. Pure Software was taken public by Morgan Stanley in 1995.

In 1996, Pure Software announced a merger with Atria Software. The merger integrated Pure Software's programs for detecting bugs in software with Atria's tools to manage development of complex software. The Wall Street Journal reported that there were problems integrating the sales forces of Pure Software and Atria after the head salesmen for both Pure and Atria left following the merger.

In 1997, the combined company, Pure Atria, was acquired by Rational Software, which triggered a 42% drop in both companies' stocks after the deal was announced. Hastings was appointed Chief Technical Officer of the combined companies and left soon after the acquisition. After Pure Software, Hastings spent two years thinking about how to avoid similar problems at his next startup.

Founder of Netflix 

In 1997, Hastings and former Pure Software employee Marc Randolph co-founded Netflix, offering flat rate movie rental-by-mail to customers in the US by combining two emerging technologies; DVDs, which were much easier to send as mail than VHS-cassettes, and a website from which to order them, instead of a paper catalogue. Headquartered in Los Gatos, California, Netflix has amassed a collection of 100,000 titles and more than 100 million subscribers. Hastings had the idea for Netflix after he left Pure Software. "I had a big late fee for Apollo 13. It was six weeks late and I owed the video store $40. I had misplaced the cassette. It was all my fault. I didn't want to tell my wife about it. And I said to myself, ‘I'm going to compromise the integrity of my marriage over a late fee?’ Later, on my way to the gym, I realized they had a much better business model. You could pay $30 or $40 a month and work out as little or as much as you wanted."

Hastings said that when he founded Netflix, he had no idea whether customers would use the service. He is a proponent of Internet television and sees it as the future. He credits YouTube for his shift in strategy for developing a video streaming service. Netflix launched a service in 2007 to stream movies and television shows to computers.

Netflix culture 
As Netflix grew, the company was noticed for its innovative management practices—the results of the culture Hastings was exploring—called “Freedom and Responsibility.” Netflix reportedly offers mediocre employees large severance packages to ensure that employees are consistently working to further the company's innovative environment. Netflix has eliminated sick and vacation time for employees, and instead allows them to manage their time off individually.

Hastings created an internal culture guide for Netflix by meeting with employees to discuss the company's culture and employees' hypotheses about it. In August 2009, Hastings posted this internal culture guide publicly online, and it eventually became a pre-employment screening tool that dissuaded incompatible people from applying.

In September 2020, Hastings and Erin Meyer co-authored a book on Netflix's culture and management principles with interviews from current and former employees. No Rules Rules: Netflix and the Culture of Reinvention was a New York Times bestseller, featured on year-end lists for publications such as NPR and The Economist. It was shortlisted for the Financial Times and McKinsey Business Book of the Year Award.

Other business ventures 
Hastings was on the board of Microsoft from 2007 to 2012. 

He was also on the board of directors of Facebook, Inc. from June 2011 to May 2019. As of September 2016, he was reported to own over US$10 million worth of Facebook shares.

Activism and philanthrophy

Education

California State Board of Education 
After selling Pure Software, Hastings found himself without a goal. He became interested in educational reform in California and enrolled in the Stanford Graduate School of Education. In 2000, Governor Gray Davis appointed Hastings to the State Board of Education, and in 2001, Hastings became its president. He spent $1 million of his own money together with $6 million from Silicon Valley venture capitalist John Doerr to promote the passage of Proposition 39 in November 2000, a measure that lowered the level of voter approval for local schools to pass construction bond issues from 66 to 55 percent.

In 2009, Hastings ran into trouble on the State Board of Education when Democratic legislators challenged his advocacy of more English instruction and language testing for non-English speaking students. The California Senate Rules Committee refused to confirm him as the board's president. The California State Legislature rejected him in January 2005. Governor Arnold Schwarzenegger, who had reappointed Hastings to the board after Hastings' first term, issued a statement saying he was “disappointed” in the committee's action. Hastings resigned.

In April 2008, Steven Maviglio reported that Hastings had made a $100,000 contribution to California Governor Schwarzenegger's “Voters First” redistricting campaign.

Charter schools 
Hastings is active in educational philanthropy and politics. One of the issues he most strongly advocates is charter schools, publicly funded elementary or secondary schools that have been freed from some of the rules, regulations, and statutes that apply to other public schools, in exchange for some type of accountability for producing certain results, which are set forth in each school's charter.

In July 2006, the Santa Cruz Sentinel reported that Hastings had donated $1 million to Beacon Education Network to open up new charter schools in Santa Cruz County, where he lives.

Hastings, as a Giving Pledge member since 2012, founded Hastings Fund and pledged $100 million to children's education. In his post on Facebook, he said that the Hastings Fund "will donate these funds in the best way possible for kids' education." Hastings Fund gave its first two gifts, totaling $1.5 million, to the United Negro College Fund and the Hispanic Foundation of Silicon Valley for college scholarships for black and Latino youth.

In March 2014, he argued for the elimination of elected school boards.

Historically Black Colleges and Universities (HBCUs) 
In June 2020, Hastings donated $120 million to be equally split among the United Negro College Fund, Morehouse College and Spelman College. It was the largest individual donation ever to support scholarships at HBCUs.

Technology 
In April 2004, Hastings authored a Wall Street Journal op-ed advocating the expensing of stock options.

Politics 
In August 2007, the Los Angeles Times reported that Hastings had donated $1 million to a committee formed to support California State Superintendent of Schools Jack O'Connell's candidacy for Governor of California in 2010.

In April 2009, Hastings donated $251,491.03 to Budget Reform Now, a coalition supporting California Propositions 1A to 1F.

Hastings supported Hillary Clinton in the 2016 US presidential election.

In 2021, Hastings gave $3 million to defeat the campaign to recall Gavin Newsom as governor of California.

Personal life 
Hastings lives in Santa Cruz, California. He is married to Patricia Ann Quillin and has two children.

He appeared in a front-page article in USA Today in 1995, posing on his Porsche. He considers that immature now and has said that if he ever appears on the front page of USA Today again it will "not [be] on the hood of a Porsche, but I would [pose] with a bunch of movies". Hastings sold his Porsche for a Toyota Avalon, but now drives a Tesla.

In 2018, Hastings appeared in a podcast series by Linkedin co-founder Reid Hoffman, Masters of Scale, and discussed the strategy adopted by Netflix to scale.

In 2020, Hastings and his wife donated $30 million to GAVI to support COVAX COVID-19 vaccines initiative.

In March 2022, Hastings donated $1 million to Razom, a Ukrainian nonprofit organization that procures emergency supplies and medical equipment such as disposable resuscitators to treat the wounded.

References

External links 
 Reed Hastings at Microsoft.com
 Reed Hastings biography at Netflix.com
 Reed Hastings articles on Peace Corps Online
 Reed Hastings interview on National Public Radio
 Part of Business 2.0's List of "10 people who don't matter"
 Part of Time's 100 Most Influential People"
 

1960 births
21st-century philanthropists
American billionaires
American computer businesspeople
Bowdoin College alumni
Buckingham Browne & Nichols School alumni
Businesspeople from Boston
California Democrats
Directors of Facebook
Directors of Microsoft
Giving Pledgers
Henry Crown Fellows
Living people
Netflix people
Peace Corps volunteers
Stanford Graduate School of Education alumni